Mazin Mohamedein Al-Nour Mohamed (born 2 May 2000) is a Sudanese professional footballer who plays as a left-back for the Sudanese club Al-Merrikh SC, and the Sudan national team.

International career
Mohamedein made his international debut with the Sudan national team in a 3–2 friendly loss to Ethiopia on 30 December 2021. He was part of the Sudan squad that was called up for the 2021 Africa Cup of Nations.

References

External links
 
 

2000 births
Living people
Sudanese footballers
Sudan international footballers
Association football fullbacks
Al-Merrikh SC players
Sudan Premier League players
2021 Africa Cup of Nations players
2022 African Nations Championship players
Sudan A' international footballers